Loch Kaitre (possibly Loch Kaitres) was a loch in Kinfauns, Perth and Kinross, Scotland.

The loch formerly occupied the site beside the Manse of Kinfauns. It was still present in 1838, but in the mid-19th century, a sinkhole appeared and the manse fell in, witnessed by the minister, who had just left his home en route to the church. The loch remained for a few generations, before being drained by a tenant later in the century for agricultural use of the land beneath it.

References

Kaitre